The Olympic Coast National Marine Sanctuary is one of 15 marine sanctuaries administered by the National Oceanic and Atmospheric Administration (NOAA), an agency of the U.S. Department of Commerce. Extending  from the shore, it includes most of the continental shelf, as well as parts of three important submarine canyons, the Nitinat Canyon, the Quinault Canyon and the Juan de Fuca Canyon. For  along the coast, the sanctuary shares stewardship with the Olympic National Park. Sanctuary stewardship is also shared with the Hoh, Quileute, and Makah Tribes, as well as the Quinault Indian Nation. The sanctuary overlays the Flattery Rocks, Quillayute Needles, and Copalis Rock National Wildlife Refuges.

References

External links
 Olympic Coast National Marine Sanctuary
 Climate Change and Ocean Acidification: Olympic Coast

Protected areas of Clallam County, Washington
Protected areas of Grays Harbor County, Washington
Protected areas of Jefferson County, Washington
National Marine Sanctuaries of the United States
Protected areas established in 1994
1994 establishments in Washington (state)